, officially typeset kiЯitɘ (see album art), is a 2005 album composed by Yasunori Mitsuda based on The Five Seasons of Kirite, a story by Masato Kato. Unlike their other previous major collaborations like Chrono Trigger, Xenogears and Chrono Cross, Kirite was never developed and published as a video game, but published as musical album bundled with Masato Kato's story text in Japanese and a collection of artistic nature photographs.  The music of Kirite incorporates Celtic music, jazz and ambient noise influences.

Story 
"The Five Seasons of Kirite" by Masato Kato set inside a world of magic and fantasy, tells the story of a boy by the name Kirite, a girl by the name Kotonoha and a darkness by the name Orochi. When those three would meet, the world would silently start to go mad.

Creation 
Yasunori Mitsuda and Masato Kato devised the concept of Kirite in 2003.

Track listing

Personnel 

 Yasunori Mitsuda – composer, sound programming, piano
 Masato Kato – story
 Junko Kudo – lyrics
 Eri Kawai – vocals, lyrics, piano
 Haruo Kondo – "early instruments"
 Akihisa Tsuboy – violin
 Tomohiko Kira – guitar, bouzouki
 Hitoshi Watanabe – bass guitar
 Kinya Sogawa – shinobue, shakuhachi
 Laurie Sogawa – tin whistle
 Hidenobu Ootsuki, Yutaka Odawara – drum kit
 Tamao Fujii – percussion
 Masumi Takahashi – photos

References

External links 
 Kirite page at Yasunori Mitsuda's website
  

2005 albums
Yasunori Mitsuda albums